Kieran J. O'Mahony OSA, is an Irish Augustinian friar and biblical scholar, who serves as the academic coordinator for the Roman Catholic Archdiocese of Dublin. He serves as a priest in Donnybrook Parish. O'Mahony served as the Catholic Ecumenical canon in St Patrick's Cathedral, Dublin from 2012 until 2017.

O'Mahony attended St Augustine's College, Dungarvan, Co. Waterford, for his secondary studies, and went on to join the Augustinian order. He studied at the Pontifical Gregorian University in Rome earning a Bachelor of Sacred Theology and the Licentiate of Sacred Theology, at St. Patrick's College, Maynooth he earned an H.Dip. in Education and also studied scripture at the Pontifical Biblical Institute in Rome. He gained PhD in biblical studies from Trinity College, Dublin.

From 1990 to 2011 he lectured in scripture at the Milltown Institute of Theology and Philosophy. O'Mahony has published a number of books on theology and has spoken at religious conferences and summer schools. 
O'Mahony runs the Tarsus.ie site on which many scripture resources, homilies, lectures and other scripture content is published. O'Mahony along with Jessie Rogers and Sean Goan, and supported by Maynooth College, The Tarsus Scripture School runs online programme for exploring the scriptures.

References

Augustinian friars
20th-century Irish Roman Catholic priests
21st-century Irish Roman Catholic theologians
Pontifical Gregorian University alumni
Alumni of St Patrick's College, Maynooth
Pontifical Biblical Institute alumni
Alumni of Trinity College Dublin
21st-century Irish Roman Catholic priests
20th-century Irish Roman Catholic theologians
Year of birth missing (living people)
Living people